The Academy of Medical-Surgical Nurses (AMSN) is a professional association for medical-surgical nurses in the United States. Its stated mission is "to promote excellence in medical-surgical nursing". AMSN was founded in 1991 and has chapters in all 50 states.

References

External links
 Official website
 The AMSN Hub

Nursing organizations in the United States
Organizations established in 1991
Pitman, New Jersey